Siddapuram is a village in West Godavari district in the state of Andhra Pradesh in India.

Demographics
Siddapuram has a population of 6,312 according to the 2011 Indian census: 3,170 males and 3,142 females. The average sex ratio of Siddapuram village is 991. The child population is 619, which makes up 9.81% of the total population of the village, with sex ratio 1043. In 2011, the literacy rate of Siddapuram village was 67.61% when compared to 67.02% of Andhra Pradesh.

See also 
 West Godavari district

References 

Villages in West Godavari district